Mansa Assembly constituency may refer to
 Mansa, Gujarat Assembly constituency
 Mansa, Punjab Assembly constituency